Miguel García Cuesta (6 October 1803 in Macotera – 18 April 1873 in Santiago de Compostela) was a professor at the University of Salamanca, Bishop of Jaca  (1848), Archbishop of Santiago de Compostela (1851), Senator for Life (1851) and Cardinal (1861).

Biography 
In 1815, at the age of twelve, he left his native village with his uncle, who was the chaplain of the Sanctuary of the Virgin of Valdejimena in Horcajo Medianero. Three years later, he was enrolled at the seminary in Salamanca, where he studied philosophy and theology and became a substitute professor of mathematics. He took his bachelor's degree from the University of Salamanca.

In 1825, he received the four minor orders and a subdeaconate. The following year, he was ordained a deacon and was named a professor of philosophy at the University. In 1828, he became a presbyter and obtained his doctorate in Holy Scripture. He was also a professor at the seminary and later became its rector.

In 1848, he was named Bishop of Jaca and, in 1851, was promoted to Archbishop of Santiago de Compostela. Queen Isabella II made him a Senator for Life and awarded him the Order of Charles III.

At the request of Pope Pius IX, he participated in the preparatory acts and the declaration of the dogmatic definition for the Immaculate Conception, after which the Pope created him a Cardinal with the titular church of Santa Prisca.

He was chosen as a deputy to the Cortes Constituyentes de 1869, where he defended the established Catholic Confessionalism of the Kingdom of Spain. This led to a dispute with the Provisional Government that prevented him from attending the First Vatican Council. Later, he was elected a senator from the Province of Vizcaya. A year before his death, he presided over the consecration of the central cupolas at the Basílica del Pilar.

He died at the Archbishop's Palace in Santiago de Compostela, and is interred in the Pantheon of Archbishops at the Metropolitan Cathedral.

Sources 
 Cardinals of the Holy Roman Church created by Pius IX @ Florida International University
 García Cuesta @ Catholic-Hierarchy.org
 Miguel García Cuesta @ the Spanish Senate website.

Further reading
 Controversy with the Cardinal Archbishop of Santiago, on the Great Question Between Protestantism and Romanism, in Letters Between the Cardinal and A. Dallas, Revised, with an Appendix by E.B. Elliott, Reprint by BiblioBazaar, 2016

External links

1803 births
1873 deaths
Academic staff of the University of Salamanca
Bishops of Jaca
Archbishops of Santiago de Compostela
19th-century Spanish cardinals
Cardinals created by Pope Pius IX
Cardinal protectors
People from the Province of Salamanca